Forg Rural District is a rural district (dehestan) in Forg District, Darab County, Fars Province, Iran. At the 2006 census, its population was 10,381, in 2,235 families.  The rural district has 15 villages.

References 

Rural Districts of Fars Province
Darab County